Ryōhei Tanaka (1933- 2019)  was  a Japanese artist. He specialised in printmaking, through etching.

His works are in several collections, including those of the Museum of Fine Arts, Boston, the Metropolitan Museum of Art, the Cleveland Museum of Art. and the National Museum of Singapore.

References

External links 

 Biography with portrait photograph

1933 births
Japanese printmakers
20th-century Japanese artists
People from Takatsuki, Osaka
2019 deaths